Year 102 (CII) was a common year starting on Saturday (link will display the full calendar) of the Julian calendar. At the time, it was known as the Year of the Consulship of Ursus and Sura (or, less frequently, year 855 Ab urbe condita). The denomination 102 for this year has been used since the early medieval period, when the Anno Domini calendar era became the prevalent method in Europe for naming years.

Events

By place

Roman Empire 
 Lucius Julius Ursus Servianus and Lucius Licinius Sura become Roman consuls. 
 Emperor Trajan returns to Rome after a successful campaign against Dacia, through which he reestablishes clear Roman sovereignty over King Decebalus.
 Trajan divides Pannonia into two provinces, sometime between this year and 107.
 The port of Portus is enlarged.

Europe

 Saxo Vandowicz II  settles into Poland.

Asia 
 Having organised the territories of the Tarim basin, Chinese General Ban Chao retires to Luoyang and dies shortly thereafter.

Deaths 
 Ban Chao, Chinese general of the Han Dynasty (b. AD 32)
 Clement I, bishop of Rome (approximate date according to Roman Catholic tradition)
 Yin, Chinese empress of the Han Dynasty

References